Main Street Jive is the third studio album by Australian musician Richard Clapton, released in 1976. It reached number 64 on the Kent Music Report. The album was produced by Richard Batchens. "Suit Yourself" was released as a single.

Track listing

Charts

Release history

References 

1976 albums
Richard Clapton albums
Albums produced by Richard Batchens
Festival Records albums
Infinity Records albums